Protected areas of Tasmania consist of protected areas located within Tasmania and its immediate onshore waters, including Macquarie Island. It includes areas of crown land (withheld land) managed by Tasmanian Government agencies as well as private reserves. As of 2016, 52% of Tasmania's land area has some form of reservation classification, the majority is managed by the Tasmania Parks & Wildlife Service (about 42% of total Tasmanian land area). Marine protected areas cover about 7.9% of state waters.

Within each classification of reserve there may be a variation of IUCN categories Australia is a signatory to the Convention of Biological Diversity and as such has obligations to report the status of its National Reserve System.IUCN provides on its website a prescription for activities consistent with the categorisation system. Changes made to the Nature Conservation Act 2002 in 2014 permit timber harvesting. These changes  made in addition to the already established right to access minerals means that many of the IUCN categorisations assigned to individual reserves in Tasmania are no longer fit for purpose. In addition many reserves have had their reserve status downgraded from a class excluding timber harvesting and mineral extraction to ones where these activities are now permitted. This mis-application of the IUCN protected area categories needs to be remedied or the reserves protected land class under the Nature Conservation Act 2002 should be adjusted to reflect its currently assigned IUCN category.

Legislation and management
Tasmania Parks and Wildlife Service manages crown land reserved under the Nature Conservation Act 2002. The 10 classes of protected land are: conservation area, historic site, game reserve, national park, nature recreation area, nature reserve, regional reserve and state reserve. The National Parks and Reserves Management act 2002 determines the management objectives for each class.
'Permanent timber production zone land' is crown land managed by Sustainable Timber Tasmania under the Forest Management Act 2013. It contains areas of informal reserves (e.g. landscape connectivity, streamside buffers, etc.)
The Department of Primary Industries, Parks, Water and Environment (DPIPWE) administers 'future potential production forest' crown land (formerly 'future reserve land') as defined in The Forestry (Rebuilding the Forest Industry) Act 2014.
The Wellington Park Management Trust is outlined in the Wellington Park Act 1993.

Summary of area totals

The following table demonstrates the distribution of terrestrial protected areas as of June 2016, any marine areas are excluded. All protected areas not managed by Tasmania Parks and Wildlife Service or Sustainable Timber Tasmania is grouped into "other", including: formal and informal reserves on public land, reserves on private land, and Wellington Park.

Marine

Commonwealth marine reserves

There are several Commonwealth marine reserves in the vicinity of Tasmania, these reserves are not within state waters and are managed by the Australian government. All of the reserves are part of the South-east Commonwealth Marine Reserve Network which contains an additional 4 reserves.

 Beagle
 Boags
 Flinders
 Franklin
 Freycinet
 Huon
 Macquarie Island
 South Tasman Rise
 Tasman Fracture
 Zeehan

Tasmanian marine protected areas
Marine protected areas (MPAs) in Tasmanian state waters are classed as either conservation area, national park or nature reserve. Only the nature reserve or national park class have either restricted fishing or no take zones.

In total 7.9% of Tasmania's State coastal waters is reserved, however only 4.2% is in no-take areas and the majority of this is concentrated around subantarctic Macquarie Island. Only 1.1% of Tasmania's immediate coastal waters are fully protected in no-take areas.

Private reserves
Reserves on private land is about 4% of the terrestrial protected areas in Tasmania.

Conservation Covenant

Landowners may protect some areas of their land by entering into a Conservation Covenant which is legally binding under the Nature Conservation Act (2002) and is registered on the land title. Although usually in perpetuity, about 7% of the covenant area in Tasmania is fixed-term.

Indigenous Protected Areas

IUCN V

Babel Island
Badger Island
Great Dog Island
lungatalanana
Mt Chappell Island
Putalina
Risdon Cove

IUCN VI

Preminghana

Private sanctuaries
Land reserved for the significant natural or cultural values while permitting the carrying out of agricultural or other activities consistent on preserving the values of the land.

Wellington Park
Wellington Park is the protected area which encompasses Mount Wellington and surrounds near Hobart. It is managed by the Wellington Park Management Trust established in 1993 whose members include: Hobart and Glenorchy City Councils, Tasmania Parks and Wildlife Service, DPIPWE, TasWater and Tourism Tasmania.

State forest

Future potential production forest
'Future potential production forest land' (FPPF or FPPFL) is crown land administered by the Department of Primary Industries, Parks, Water and Environment (DPIPWE) where, except in some circumstances for "special species timbers", no native forest harvesting can be undertaken. It was formally classified as 'future reserve land' (FRL) under the Tasmanian Forests Agreement. FPPF may be converted to 'permanent timber production zone land' (PTPZ or PTPZL) after 2020.

Background
The fate of FRL was dependent upon Tasmanian forest practices gaining Forest Stewardship Council (FSC) certification. In the recent 2014 audit, Forestry Tasmania (now Sustainable Timber Tasmania) complied with 193 indicators, but needed further action on 10 more.

In September 2014 the Tasmanian government passed legislation which reclassified the 400,000 hectares of FRL as FPPF. After the expiration of the memorandum in April 2020, areas of FPPF can be converted to PTPZ where native forest logging can occur, subject to parliamentary approval. Until 2020, only limited "special species timber" harvesting can be undertaken in FPPF.

Permanent timber production zone land
Sustainable Timber Tasmania is a government business enterprise owned by the Tasmanian Government which manages and operates state forest on crown land (officially classified as 'permanent timber production zone land'). Some of this land has informal protection and is managed for conservation as part of the Tasmanian CAR reserve system (e.g. habitat for threatened species, streamside protection, landscape connectivity).

Forest reserves
Forest reserves are located on 'permanent timber production zone land' and may have recreation or other tourism facilities.

Brookerana
Dalgarth
Griffin
Hollybank
Jean Brook
Lawrence Rivulet
Oldina
Springfield
Tahune
Upper Natone
Wes Beckett

Conservation areas
A protected area of land predominantly in a natural state. The sustainable use of natural resources may be permitted, such as mining, special species timber harvesting or hunting. Mostly IUCN protected area categories IV, V or VI.

IUCN Ia or Ib

Picton River
Unnamed (Sun Ridge)

IUCN II

Boyd
Drys Bluff
Liffey
Meander
Unnamed (Gillam Creek Road)
Unnamed (Gunns Plains)
Unnamed (Mayberry CA)

IUCN III

Big Tree
Emu River
Fossil Cove
Gunns Plains
Meetus Falls
Roger River Road
Styx Tall Trees
Unnamed (Sassafras Creek)

IUCN IV

Alma Tier
Arve Loop
Big Sassy Creek
Bligh Point
Bluff River
Boggy Creek
Boot Bay
Brother and Sister
Brown Mountain
Brushy Rivulet
Buxton River
Christmas Hills
Cleveland Lagoon
Coal Point
Coxs Hill
Deep Lagoons
Den Hill
Denison Ridge
Dismal Range
Duck River East
Eastern Tiers
Exe Rivulet
Fisher Tier
Flowerdale River
Franklin Rivulet
Gentle Annie
Jackeys Creek
Kenmere Creek
Lake Binney
Lake Mikany
Lanes Tier
Long Hill
Lost Falls
MacLaines Creek
Marion Beach
Mersey River
Midday Hill
Middle Arm
Millers Bluff
Montagu Island
Mount Bruny
Mount Dromedary
Mount Hicks Road
Mount Mangana
Mount Midway
Mount Morrison
Mount Ponsonby
Mount Thunderbolt
Narrawa Road
North Styx
Ouse River
Pelican Island
Plains Creek
Quamby Bluff
Rebecca Creek
Red Reef
Reedy Marsh
Remarkable Rock
Rimons Hill
River Hill
Royal George
Sand River
Sandspit River
Shannon River
Shingle Hill
Sisters Island
Snake Bay
Snaky Creek
Table Mountain Shore
Tanina Bluff
Tarraleah
Tippogoree Hills
Tooms Lake
Tungatinah
Virginstow
Warrawee
Wayatinah
Wentworth Creek
Whalers Lookout
Wild Bee
Wyre Forest Creek
Yellow Bluff Creek
 Unnamed (Badger Head Road)
 Unnamed (Clerkes Hill)

IUCN V

Alpha Pinnacle
Anderson Islands
Apex Point
Arthur River
Badger Spur
Battery Island
Bellettes Bay
Big Bay
Black River
Black River Bridge
Black River South
Blyth Point
Boxen Island
Bridgenorth
Bull Rock
Bun Beetons Point
Burnett Point
Calder River
Calverts Lagoon
Cam River
Cam River South
Cape de la Sortie
Cape Portland
Carr Villa
Cataraqui Point
Champion Park
Chasm Creek
Cheeseberry Hill
Chronicle Point
City of Melbourne Bay
Clarence River
Clifton Beach
Cone Islet
Craggy Island
Crooked Billet Bay
Doctors Rocks
Don Heads
Doughboy Island
Duck River
Eaglehawk Bay-Flinders Bay
East Cam River
East Moncoeur Island
Edgcumbe Beach
Egg Beach
Eldorado
Elizabeth River
Esperance Point
Esperance River
Fannys Bay
Fingal Rivulet
Five Mile Pinnacles
Fletchers Hill West
Forth Falls Creek
Forwards Beach
Fotheringate Bay
Four Mile Creek
Good Marsh
Granite Point
Great Lake
Great Musselroe River
Greens Beach
Griggs Creek
Harbour Islets
Harcus Island
Harry Walker Tier
Hastings Bay
Henderson Islets
Holts Point
Hunter Island
Jones Rivulet
Kangaroo Island
Lackrana
Lake Dulverton
Lake River
Lighthouse Point
Little Island
Little Pine Lagoon
Little Swanport
Little Trefoil
Long Bay
Long Reach
Macquarie River
Marriott Reef
Marshall Beach
McDonalds Point
Middle Island
Montagu Beach
Morass Bay
Mount Wedge
Murkay Islets
Nares Rocks
Neds Reef
Ninth Island
Norfolk Bay
North George River
North Passage Point
North West Bay
North West Head
North-East Park
Ocean Beach
Outer North Head
Pasco Group
Peter Murrell
Plenty River
Point Bailly
Point du Ressac
Port Cygnet
Port Sorell
Prosser River
Punchbowl
Ralphs Bay
Ram Island
Red Hut Point
River Tyne
Rocky Point
Roydon Island
Running Ground Ridge
Salem Bay
Sassafras Gully
Seacrow Islet
Seagull Islet
Sentinel Island
Settlement Point
Sheepwash Bay
Shell Islets
Sidmouth
Simpsons Bay
Sloping Main
South Pats River
Spike Island
Split Rock Saddle
Stokes Point
Stringybark
Sugarloaf Rock
Tailers Bay
Tamar
Tea-Tree Bay
Trousers Point Beach
Truganini
Tully River
Tyenna River
Vansittart Island
Wallaby Islands
Wayatinah Lagoon
Wellwood Creek
West Arm
White Beach
Youngs Creek
 Unnamed (Badger Corner)
 Unnamed (Duck Bay)
 Unnamed (Goulds Lagoon)
 Unnamed (Kingston Golf Course)
 Unnamed (Lake Leake)
 Unnamed (Mersey Hill Karst)
 Unnamed (Mersey River)
 Unnamed (Pipers River)
 Unnamed (Sanspit River)
 Unnamed (The Lea)
 Unnamed (Wet Cave)
 Unnamed South Esk

IUCN VI

Adamsfield
Ansons Bay
Ansons River
Apsley
Arthur Bay
Arthur-Pieman
Bay of Fires
Bernafai Ridge
Blythe River
Boltons Beach
Boobyalla
Boobyalla River
Bouchers Creek
Brick Islands
Brid River
Briggs Islet
Brookerana
Brougham Sugarloaf
Cat Island
Catamaran River
Central Plateau
Chalky Island
Chauncy Vale
Chuckle Head
Coles Bay
Colliers Swamp
Coswell Beach
Counsel Hill
Cressy Beach
Crotty
Dans Hill
Darling Range
Dasher River
Denison Rivulet
Detention Falls
Devils Den
Double Sandy Point
Egg Islands
Five Mile Bluff
Foochow
Forsyth Island
Fossil Bluff
George Town
Goose Island
Gordons Ridge
Granite Tor
Gravelly Ridge
Great Western Tiers
Gull Island
Heazlewood Hill
Hogan Group
Howie Island
Jacksons Cove
Judbury
Kelvedon Beach
Lagoons Beach
Lake Beatrice
Lees Point
Liawenee
Lillico Beach
Lime Pit Road
Limekiln Creek
Little Beach
Little Boobyalla River
Little Chalky Island
Little Green Island
Little Quoin
Logan Lagoon
Long Island
Long Tom
Low Point
Marks Point
Mayfield Bay
Medeas Cove
Mile Island
Millingtons Beach
Molesworth
Moss Gully
Mount Bethune
Mount Faulkner
Mount Royal
Mount Rumney
Mountain Creek
Mulligans Hill
Murphys Flat
Musselroe Bay
Night Island
Oyster Rocks
Pardoe Northdown
Parnella
Passage Island
Patriarchs
Peggs Beach
Perkins Island
Porky Beach
Prime Seal Island
Princess River
Rainbow Point
Randalls Bay
Raspins Beach
Redbill Point
Reef Island
Roaring Beach
Russell Ridge
Sea Elephant
Sensation Gorge
Seymour
Shag Lagoon
Sherwood Hill
Single Tree Plain
Sister Islands
Slaves Bay
South Arm
South Esk River
Southport Lagoon
Spiky Beach
Spinning Gum
St Clair Lagoon
St Helens
Stanley
Storehouse Island
Strickland
Summer Camp
Surveyors Bay
Swansea
Swift Creek
Table Mountain
Tathams Lagoon
Tatlows Beach
The Dutchman
Tiger Rise
Top Marshes
Tunbridge Tier
Upper Blythe
Vale of Belvoir
Waddles Creek
Waterhouse
Waterhouse Island
Wedge Island
West Inlet
White Kangaroo
Wielangta
Woodbridge Hill
Wright and Egg Islands
Wybalenna Island
Yarlington
 Unnamed (Fern Glade)
 Unnamed (Long Marsh)
 Unnamed (Pipers Brook)
 Unnamed (Tooms Lake)

Marine conservation areas
Marine conservation areas do not have any fishing restrictions.

Blackman Rivulet
Central Channel
Cloudy Bay Lagoon
Hippolyte Rocks
Huon Estuary
Monk Bay
Opossum Bay
Port Cygnet
River Derwent
Roberts Point
Simpsons Point
Sloping Island
South Arm
Waterfall-Fortescue

Game reserves
An area of land conserved for containing natural values that are unique, important or have representative value; particularly games species and allowing the sustainable hunting these species.

Actaeon Island
Bird Island
Bruny Island Neck
Farm Cove
Lake Tiberias
Little Dog Island
Moulting Lagoon
New Year Island
North East River
Petrel Islands
Sellars Lagoon
Stack Island

Historic sites
Land with significant historic cultural heritage and is conserved for presentation of these features for public appreciation and education. Most are IUCN protected area category V.

IUCN II
Macquarie Harbour

IUCN IV

Cemetery Point
Premaydena Point

IUCN V

Batchelors Grave
Callington Mill
Cape Sorell
Cascades Female Factory
Coal Mines
Currie Lightkeepers Residence
D'Entrecasteaux Monument
D'Entrecasteaux Watering Place
Eaglehawk Neck
Eddystone Point Lighthouse
Entally House
George III Monument
Highfield
Kangaroo Bluff
Low Head
Lyons Cottage
Mount Direction
Port Arthur
Richmond Gaol
Ross Female Convict Station
Shot Tower
Strahan Customs House
Sydney Cove
Tasman Monument
Toll House
Waubadebars Grave
Yorktown

National parks
A national park in Tasmania is defined as a large natural area of land containing a representative or outstanding sample of major natural regions, features or scenery. National parks serve to protect and maintain the natural and cultural values of the area of land while providing for ecologically sustainable recreation.

IUCN Ia or Ib

Maria Island
Cradle Mountain-Lake St Clair
Franklin-Gordon Wild Rivers
Savage River
Southwest
Walls of Jerusalem

IUCN II

Ben Lomond
Douglas-Apsley
Freycinet
Hartz Mountains
Kent Group
Mole Creek Karst
Mount Field
Mount William
Narawntapu
Rocky Cape
South Bruny
Strzelecki
Tasman

National parks (marine)
Three national parks also have a marine protected area component.

 Kent Group (forms part of Kent Group National Park)
 Maria Island (forms part of Maria Island National Park)
 Port Davey/Bathurst (forms part of Southwest National Park)

Nature recreation areas
Is predominantly in a natural state or contains sensitive natural sites of significance for recreation. Reserved for public recreation and education consistent with conserving the values of the area.

IUCN III

Pirates Bay
Trevallyn

IUCN V

Black Bluff
Briant Hill
Coningham
Donaldson River
Gellibrand Point
Gordons Hill
Hope Island
Humbug Point
Kate Reed
Knopwood Hill
Lake Barrington
Meehan Range
Mount Dial
Palana Beach
Recherche Bay
Reynolds Falls
Rosny Hill
Snug Tiers

IUCN VI

Emita
Killiecrankie
Mount Tanner

Nature reserves
An area of land that is conserved for the natural values that contribute to the natural biological or geological diversity of the area and are unique, important or have representative value. Mostly IUCN protected area category Ia.

IUCN Ia

Africa Gully
Albatross Island
Andersons
Basin
Bass Pyramid
Baynes Island
Black Pyramid Rock
Butlers Ridge
Calverts Hill
Cape Bernier
Cape Deslacs
Christmas Island
Coal River Gorge
Councillor Island
Curtis Island
Dead Dog Hill
Dennes Hill
Devils Tower
Diamond Island
Dickinsons
Dry Creek East
Dry Creek South
Dry Creek West
Duckholes Lagoons
Elderslie
Foster Islands
George Rocks
Hardys Hill
Hawley
Heathy Hills
Hospital Creek
Huntingdon
Ile Des Phoques
Ironpot Gully
Isabella Island
Isle of Caves
Kentford Forest
Lachlan Island
Lake Johnston
Little Christmas Island
Little Swan Island
Little Waterhouse Island
Low Islets
Macquarie Island (World Heritage)
Mersey Hill Karst
Moriarty Rocks
North East Islet
Paddys Island
Pelham
Pelham North
Pelham West
Penguin Islet
Powranna
Reid Rocks
Rocka Rivulet
Rodondo Island
Sith Cala
Spectacle Islands
Tenth Island
The Doughboys
Tinderbox
West Moncoeur Island
Wingaroo
Woodvine
Wright Rock

IUCN IV

Betsey Island
Big Green Island
Chappell Islands
Cherry Tree Hill
East Kangaroo Island
Green Island
Jordan
Muddy Lagoon
Narrows Road
Native Point
Pitt Water
Three Sisters-Goat Island
Tom Gibson
Township Lagoon

IUCN V

Badger Box Creek
Lily Lagoon

Marine nature reserves

Governor Island
Macquarie Island
Ninepin Point
Tinderbox

Regional reserves

May have also previously been known as forest reserves, a regional reserve is an area of land with a high mineral potential or prospectively and is predominantly in a natural state. The purpose of reservation is for mineral exploration and the development of mineral deposits and/or the controlled use of other natural resources, including special species timber harvesting, while protecting and maintaining the natural and cultural values.

IUCN III

Dip Falls
Hardings Falls
Julius River
Lake Chisholm
Mount Puzzler
South Weld
Sumac

IUCN IV

Andersons Creek
Apslawn
Arm River
Avenue River
Badger River
Balfour Track
Bells Marsh
Black Creek
Black Jack Hill
Blue Tier
Boco Creek
Bond Tier
Bonneys Tier
Borradaile
Break O'Day
Burns Peak
Caroline Creek
Coppermine Creek
Crayfish Creek
Cygnet River
Deep Gully
Den Ranges
Derby
Dial Range
Dickies Ridge
Dip River
Dismal Swamp
Doctors Peak
Dogs Head Hill
Dove River
Emu Ground
Fords Pinnacle
Frome
German Town
Hatfield River
Henty
Huntsmans Cap
Huskisson River
John Lynch
Joy Creek
Kohls Falls
Lady Binney
Lady Nelson
Lake Pieman
Laurel Creek
Lefroy
Lobster Rivulet
Long Ridge
Lovells Creek
Lower Marsh Creek
Luncheon Hill
Lutregala Creek
Mackintosh
Maggs Mountain
Martins Hill
Mathinna Falls
Mersey White Water
Milkshake Hills
Montagu River
Montagu Swamp
Mount Arthur
Mount Careless
Mount Horror / Konewongener
Mount Kershaw
Mount Maurice
Mount Stronach
Mount Victoria
Nicholas Range
North Esk
North Scottsdale
Nunamara
Old Park
Oxberry Plains
Paradise Plains
Parangana Sugarloaf
Peaked Hill
Pepper Hill
Pipers River
Porcupine Hill
Promised Land
Prossers
Pruana
Rayners Hill
Ringarooma River
Roaring Magg Hill
Savage River Pipeline
Sawmill Creek
Sawpit Ridge
Scamander
Shakespeare Hills
Snow Hill
Snowy River
South Esk
Staverton
Swan River
Teds Flat
Tombstone Creek
Trowutta
Waratah Creek
Warra Creek
Weavers Creek
Welcome Swamp
Winterbrook Falls

IUCN V

Evercreech
Humboldt Ridge
Lizard Hill
Styx River
Weld River

IUCN VI

Avoca
Barway Spur
Briggs
Cameron
Castle Cary
Clear Hill
Crotty Ridge
Dip Range
Dog Kennels
Florentine River
Four Mile Beach
Gog Range
Leven Canyon
Lukes Knob
Meredith Range
Mount Dundas
Mount Farrell
Mount Heemskirk
Mount Murchison
Mount Roland
Parting Creek
Renison Bell
St Pauls
Teepookana
Tikkawoppa Plateau
Tyndall
West Coast Range

State reserves
An area of land which provides protection and maintenance for significant natural landscapes, features, or sites of significance to Aboriginal people. Most are IUCN protected area category II or III.

IUCN Ia

Dart Island
Iron Pot

IUCN II

Alum Cliffs
Calm Bay
Devils Gullet
Disappointment Bay
East Risdon
Echo Sugarloaf
Hellyer Gorge
Lavinia
Lime Bay
Peter Murrell
Pieman River
St Patricks Head
Three Hummock Island
Welcome River
Wye River

IUCN III

Bradys Lookout
Cape Wickham
Derwent Cliffs
Eaglehawk Bay
Eugenana
Fairy Glade
Ferndene
Forest Vale
Forth Falls
Gunns Plains Cave
Hastings Caves
Henty Glacial Erratics
Holwell Gorge
Ida Bay
Junee Cave
Kimberley Springs
Liffey Falls
Little Peggs Beach
Lookout Rock
Marriotts Falls
Mersey Bluff
Mount Barrow
Mount Barrow Falls
Mount Montgomery
Mount Pearson
Notley Gorge
Quarantine Station
Roger River
Safety Cove
Seal Rocks
St Columba Falls
St Marys Pass
Stewarts Bay
Sundown Point
Table Cape
Tessellated Pavement
The Nut
The Steppes
Three Thumbs
Trial Harbour
Trowutta Caves
Waterfall Creek
Weldborough Pass
West Point
Yellow Creek

See also

 Protected areas of Australia

Notes
 Definitions for the classes of protected areas within this article (see: Nature Conservation Act 2002 - Section 78 Schedule 1: Determination of class of reserved land) may be regionally specific to the state of Tasmania.

References

Further reading
 Tasmania's Protected Areas on Private Land Program

External links
 Tasmania Parks and Wildlife Service
 Tasmanian Reserve Estate spatial layer - Land Tasmania Tasmanian Reserve Estate dataset, the authoritative source of Tasmanian spatial data
 Protected Planet - a comprehensive database of protected areas

 
Tasmania
Lists of tourist attractions in Tasmania